"Keep On Loving You" is a soft rock power ballad written by Kevin Cronin and performed by American rock band REO Speedwagon. It features the lead guitar work of Gary Richrath. The song first appeared on REO Speedwagon's 1980 album Hi Infidelity. It was the first REO Speedwagon single to break the top 50 on the U.S. Billboard Hot 100, reaching the number-one spot for one week in March 1981. The single was certified platinum for U.S. sales of over one million copies. It peaked at number seven on the UK Singles Chart. "Keep On Loving You" has been a mainstay on 1980s soft rock compilations and has appeared on dozens of 'various artists' compilation albums, as well as several REO Speedwagon greatest hits albums.

Ultimate Classic Rock critic Matt Wardlaw rated it REO Speedwagon's all-time greatest song.

Background and recording
Kevin Cronin stated that he wrote "Keep On Loving You" as a more traditional love ballad, and the band as a whole developed it into its final arrangement as a power ballad. He recounted: 

Cronin also said: 

Epic Records did not think the song was good enough to be released as a single but the band persuaded them to do so.

Music video
In 1981, a video of the song was the 17th played on the first day of broadcast of MTV, on August 1. It was framed by a scene of Kevin Cronin talking about his relationship troubles with a female psychiatrist and contained a shot where a woman picked up a telephone connected to Gary Richrath's guitar, referencing the live version of "157 Riverside Avenue."

Personnel
REO Speedwagon
Kevin Cronin - lead and backing vocals, acoustic guitar, piano
Gary Richrath - electric guitars
Bruce Hall - bass 
Neal Doughty - Hammond organ
Alan Gratzer - drums

Additional personnel
 Steve Forman – percussion
 Tom Kelly – backing vocal
 Richard Page – backing vocal

Chart performance

Weekly charts

Year-end charts

Certifications

See also
List of Billboard Hot 100 number-one singles of 1981

References 

1980 singles
1980 songs
1981 singles
1980s ballads
Billboard Hot 100 number-one singles
Cashbox number-one singles
REO Speedwagon songs
Songs written by Kevin Cronin
Epic Records singles
Song recordings produced by Kevin Beamish
Song recordings produced by Gary Richrath
Song recordings produced by Kevin Cronin
Rock ballads